Wied may mean:

Places
County of Wied, a County of Rhineland-Palatinate, Germany
Wied (river), in Rhineland-Palatinate, Germany
Wied, Rhineland-Palatinate, a community in Rhineland-Palatinate, Germany
Wied, Texas, an unincorporated area in Texas, USA

People with the surname

David de Wied (1925–2004), Dutch professor of pharmacology
Elisabeth of Wied (1843–1916), Queen of Romania, widely known by her literary name of Carmen Sylva
Friedrich IV of Wied (1518–1568), Archbishop-Elector of Cologne
Gustav Wied (1858–1914), Danish writer
Hermann of Wied (1477–1552), Archbishop-Elector of Cologne
Steve Wied, former drummer of the American grunge band Tad
Thekla Carola Wied (born 1944), German actress
Theoderich von Wied (c. 1170–1242), Archbishop and Prince-elector of Trier
Wilhelm of Wied (1876–1945), briefly a ruler of Albania

See also
Weid (disambiguation)